Cloranolol (Tobanum) is a beta blocker.

Synthesis
β-Adrenergic blocker. Prepn:

References 

Beta blockers
Chloroarenes
N-tert-butyl-phenoxypropanolamines